Latastia  johnstonii, also known as Johnston's long-tailed lizard or Nyasaland long-tailed lizard, is a species of lizard found in Tanzania, Malawi, Democratic Republic of the Congo, Zambia, Mozambique, and Zimbabwe.

References

Reptiles described in 1907
Latastia
Taxa named by George Albert Boulenger